Jamie Roberts,  better known by his stage name Blawan, is an English DJ and record producer from South Yorkshire. He is best known for his track "Why They Hide Their Bodies Under My Garage?" and his remix of the Radiohead track "Bloom", which appeared on their album TKOL RMX 1234567 (2011). He came to prominence with his debut release Fram on the label Hessle Audio and signed to R&S Records. He also started a hardware-only project Karenn, with fellow R&S producer Pariah.

Credited as one of the artists spearheading the industrial techno revival, Blawan's post-dubstep sounds and raw, techno-influenced beats have earned him praise from DJs such as Surgeon and the Black Dog. According to Philip Sherburne of Pitchfork, his music is "full of jackhammering kicks, splintered wooden percussion, and short-fuse breakdowns".

Discography

Albums
 Wet Will Always Dry (2018)

EPs
 Peaches (2011)
 Bohla (2011)
 Cursory (with The Analogue Cops) (2011)
 Long Distance Open Water Worker (2012)
 His He She & She (2012)
 Warm Tonal Touch (2015)
 Hanging Out the Birds (2015)
 Communicat 1022 (2016)
 Shy Dancers on Bungalowdorf Beach (as Bored Young Adults) (2016)
 Walk Type (as Kilner) (2016)
 Nutrition (2017)
 Many Many Pings (2019)
 Immulsion (2020)
 Make a Goose (2020)
 Soft Waahls (2021)
 Woke Up Right Handed (2021)

Singles
 "Fram" / "Iddy" (2010)
 "Jackal Ter9's" / "Mid-Life Crisis" (with Ste Shine) (2010)
 "Getting Me Down" (2011)
 "What You Do with What You Have" / "Vibe Decorum" (2011)

References

External links
 

Living people
English DJs
English record producers
English techno musicians
English industrial musicians
Post-dubstep musicians
People from South Yorkshire
Electronic dance music DJs
Date of birth missing (living people)
Year of birth missing (living people)
Musicians from Yorkshire